Kilian Delgado Quijones (born 1 April 1990) is a Chilean footballer that currently plays for Provincial Osorno in the Segunda División Profesional de Chile.

Career
Starts his football career in Deportes Valdivia the year 2009, through the various divisions of the Chilean soccer with the club. In the year 2016 achieved with the Torreon the title of the Segunda División. Completed its contract with Deportes Valdivia, signed with Coquimbo Unido, club with which will play for the year 2016.

Honors

Club
Deportes Valdivia
 Segunda División Profesional (1): 2015–16

Coquimbo Unido
 Primera B de Chile (1): 2018

External links
 
 

1990 births
Living people
People from Valdivia
Chilean footballers
Chilean Primera División players
Primera B de Chile players
Segunda División Profesional de Chile players
Deportes Valdivia footballers
Coquimbo Unido footballers
Cobreloa footballers
San Marcos de Arica footballers
C.D. Arturo Fernández Vial footballers
Provincial Osorno footballers
Association football forwards
Association football midfielders